Leskova is a village located in the municipality of Tutin, southwestern Serbia. According to the 2011 census, the village has a population of 292 inhabitants.

Leskova like other villages of Tutin was founded by Albanian fis who moved there from what is today Albania. The elders of the village recount that a blood feud caused their settlement near Tutin. Leskova is the main village of the Upper Pešter plateau.

The first windmill farm opened in Serbia is located near Leskova; it was opened in 2011 and has an installed capacity of 600 KW.

References

Sources

Populated places in Raška District